Reg Grant (16 December 1932 – 27 May 1979) was an  Australian rules footballer who played with North Melbourne in the Victorian Football League (VFL).

Notes

External links 

1932 births
1979 deaths
Australian rules footballers from Victoria (Australia)
North Melbourne Football Club players